Rezang La,
also called Rechin La,
is a mountain pass on the Line of Actual Control between Indian-administered Ladakh and the Chinese-administered Spanggur Lake basin that is also claimed by India. The pass is located on the eastern watershed ridge of the Chushul Valley that China claims as its boundary. It is at the head of the Rezang Lungpa valley, which houses a stream draining into the Spanggur Lake.

About 3 km southeast of Rechin La is a pass leading to another valley that is also called "Rezang Lungpa". China recognizes this pass as Rezang La.

About 3 km northwest of Rechin La is another pass that was the site of a major battle of the 1962 Sino-Indian War. A company of India's 13 Kumaon battalion fought to the last man in an effort to block the Chinese PLA troops from crossing the ridge into the Chushul Valley.

During the 2020–2021 China–India skirmishes, these passes were again the site of a major face-off between the two nations' armies.

Toponymy 

The old suvey maps of the region label two adjacent valleys leading to the Spaanggur Lake from the south as "Rezang Lungpa". (See the AMS map.) In addition to the passes at the heads of the valleys, there are numerous other passes leading to branch valleys. Potentially, all of them could bear the name "Rezang La".

The Government of India has stated that it uses the name "Rezang La" for the same pass as in the survey map, the one at the head of the western valley. Chinese sources use the name "Rechin La" for this pass, which has also been adopted by the Indian news media in 2020.

Geography 

Rezang La and Rechin La are mountain passes on the ridge line adjoining the Chushul Valley, which China claims as its border. India's claimed border is further east, and it coincides with the border shown on most British and international maps prior to Indian independence. The Line of Actual Control (LAC) resulting from the 1962 Sino-Indian War coincides with the Chinese claim line in this region.

From northwest to southeast the LAC passes through the Finger 4 area on the northern shore of the Pangong Lake, the middle of the Phursook Bayon the southern shore, then the Helmet Top hill, Gurung Hill, Spanggur Gap, Magar Hill, Mukhpari hill, Rezang La, Rechin La and then Mount Sajum.

The Chushul village and Indian military post are 27 km northwest of Rezang La.

Military operations

1962 battle of Rezang La

During the Sino-Indian War in 1962, Rezang La was the site of the last stand of the Charlie ‘C’ Ahir company of 13 Kumaon, consisting of 124 Indian soldiers.

The company was led by Major Shaitan Singh, who won a posthumous Param Vir Chakra for his actions.
From the Indian point of view, Rezang La had the drawback that an intervening feature blocked artillery operation, so that the Indian infantry had to do without artillery cover.

In the action on 18 November 1962, Indian sources claim 114 Indian soldiers out of a total of 120 were killed and more than 1000 Chinese troops were killed. A memorial in Rewari, where most of the  Ahir soldiers came from, claims that 1,300 Chinese soldiers were killed in the battle. 
The Indian side was led by Major Shaitan Singh, who was later posthumously awarded Param Vir Chakra, India's highest gallantry award.

2020 border standoff 

During border standoff in summer, the Indian Army deployed troops along the Line of Actual Control south of the Pangong Tso, including at Rezang La and Rechin La. This was said to give them a commanding view of the Spanggur Gap and China's "Moldo sector" (the deployments around the Spanggur Lake).

War memorials (Ahir Dham)

Rezang La War Memorial at Chushul

The inscription on the War Memorial at Chushul, Ladakh raised by the Indian Army in memory of the soldiers who died in the Battle of Rezang La, reads as below. The first four lines are quoted from Horatius, a poem by Thomas Babington Macaulay, member of the Governor-General of India's Supreme Council from 1834 to 1838

How can a man die better,
Than facing fearful odds,
For the ashes of his fathers,
And the temples of his gods.
To the sacred memory of
the heroes of Rezang-La
114 martyrs of 13 Kumaon
who fought
to the last man last round
against hordes of Chinese
on
18 November 1962.
Built by all ranks 
13th Battalion the Kumaon Regiment.

Major-General Ian Cardozo writes in his book "Param Vir, Our Heroes in Battle": 

General T.N. Raina lauded:

Rezang La War Memorial at Rewari 

General K S Thimayya wished for a memorial to be built in Ahirwal region of Haryana in the memory of soldiers who were mostly from this area. He felt generations to come would seek inspiration from the immense courage and valour of their forefathers. Consequently, another Rezang La war memorial was constructed by Rezangla Shaurya Samiti inside Rezang La Park near Dharuhera Chowk in Rewari city in Ahirwal region. Annual memorial function is held by the Samiti in collaboration with district administration, the Kumaon Regiment and family members of those who died at Rezang La also participate.
In every special and cultural events in Delhi-NCR and Rewari the two Bravest soldiers Capt. Ram Chander Singh and Hav Nihal Singh, Sena Medal will be chief guest as they tell the story of Rezang La which gives motivation to young generation about valour of "Veer Ahirs". Recently on 24 Feb 2023, they were the Chief Guests on Rao Bal Kishan Shaurya Diwas. They also unveiled the portrait of "Rao Bal Kishan".

See also
 Border Personnel Meeting point 
 India-China Border Roads
 Sino-Indian border dispute
 Gurung Hill

References

Bibliography

External links
 Rezang La War Memorial in Chushul
 Rezangla Shaurya Samiti

Mountain passes of China
Mountain passes of Tibet
Mountain passes of Ladakh
Sino-Indian War
Borders of Ladakh
Rutog County